Case No.18/9 is a 2013 Indian Kannada language film directed by Mahesh Rao, a remake of the Tamil film Vazhakku Enn 18/9 (2012). The film stars Niranjan Shetty and Sindhu Lokanath. The supporting cast features Abhishek, Shweta Pandit and Rangayana Raghu.

Cast

 Niranjan Shetty as Mahadeva
 Sindhu Lokanath as Lakshmi
 Abhishek as Sandy
 Shweta Pandit as Kavya
 Rangayana Raghu as Revanna
 Girija Lokesh
 Kari Subbu
 Karthik Sharma
 Mico Nagaraj
 Marina Thara
 Rekha V. Kumar
 Koli Ramya
 Apoorva
 Kuri Prathap
 Victory Vasu
 Girish
 Girish Jatthi
 Gowda Kondajji
 Shailashree
 Joseph
 Master Goutham
 Manjula
 Vijay Simha
 Harshika Poonacha as an item number

Production and marketing
The film was announced in September 2012, as the remake of the 2012 Tamil film Vazhakku Enn 18/9. Niranjan Shetty and Sindhu Lokanath were signed to play the lead roles. Shweta Pandit was signed to play the role of a school-going girl in the film, in October 2012. Reports came out in March 2013, that Harshika Poonacha would be making a cameo appearance in the film, in an item number.

The trailer of the film featuring sequences of action and romance, was released on YouTube on 30 April 2013.

Soundtrack

The music for the soundtrack was composed by Arjun Janya, also writing the lyrics for the track "Yakbekithappa Mobile Phonu". The other tracks had lyrics were written by Ghouse Peer, V. Nagendra Prasad, Mahesh Rao, Vikas Chandra and Hrudaya Shiva. The album consists of seven soundtracks.

Critical reception
Upon theatrical release, the film received generally positive reviews from critics. The performances Niranjan Shetty, Sindhu Lokanath, Shwetha Pandit and Rangayana Raghu, and the film's direction, screenplay and narration received praise from critics.

G. S. Kumar of The Times of India reviewed the film giving it a rating of 3.5/5 and wrote, "Armed with an excellent script, director Mahesh Rao has handled the sequences very well with good narration". He concluded crediting the performances of all the lead characters, and the cinematography and music. Bangalore Mirror, in its review called the film "a laudable effort" and praises the performances of Niranjan Shetty, Sindhu Lokanath, Shwetha Pandit and Rangayana Raghu, and credits the screenplay and music. Writing for Deccan Herald, B. S. Srivani gave the film a 3-star rating and wrote, "Case no. 18/9 stands out for several reasons. Sabha Kumar’s camerawork is excellent, Arjun Janya revives spirits with his score and Deepu S Kumar is so mindful of his scissors, the impact created by the secondary leads is maximised, leading to a rather tame climax, which appears so mainly because it comes out so naturally!" and concluded writing, "Nirranjan’s lament, Sindhu’s shining eyes, Abhishek’s sneer, Shwetha’s body language and Raghu’s quiet competence linger long after the case is closed." Sify.com gave the film an average rating and said the film "original essence of the movie (Vazhakku Enn 18/9) has been retained from the start till the end." It also added that the performances of Raghu stand out and credited the director's "technical brilliance, grip over narration and impressive film-making."

Award nominations

3rd South Indian International Movie Awards
 Best Actress in a Supporting Role (Kannada) – Sindhu Lokanath
 Best Male Debutant (Kannada) – Niranjan Shetty

References

External links
 

2013 films
2010s Kannada-language films
Kannada remakes of Tamil films
Films scored by Arjun Janya
Films directed by Mahesh Rao